Lathan McKay (born January 10, 1978) is an American producer, historian, entrepreneur, actor, writer and co-founder of the Evel Knievel Museum. As a former professional skateboarder, he has amassed the largest collection of Evel Knievel memorabilia in the world. The collection now resides at the official Evel Knievel Museum alongside Historic Harley Davidson.

Biography 
McKay was born on January 10, 1978, in Austin, Texas. The second of the two children of Karlan McKay and Karen McCall. He and his older sister, Amy, were raised in Missouri City, Texas.

He started skateboarding as a child, and became sponsored at 14. Inspired by Evel Knievel, he spent a decade on the road as a professional, breaking for a year to attend the University of Texas at Austin. McKay became a 70s-era cinephile and was inspired by existential films like Cisco Pike, Night Moves, Charley Varrick, Little Fauss and Big Halsy, Thunderbolt and Lightfoot, films by Sam Peckinpah, and particularly Monte Hellman’s Two-Lane Blacktop.

2003-2011

In 2003, McKay starred in Levelland, a film about coming of age in the flatlands of Texas. Several of its non-fictional characters were skateboarders, and director Clark Lee Walker, co-writer of The Newton Boys, cast avid skateboarders to act in the film. Levelland premiered at the 2003 Tribeca Film Festival.

In 2004, McKay moved to Los Angeles to continue a career as an actor. As he was looking for a place to live, he was introduced to his favorite film director Monte Hellman by a friend, actor Nicky Katt. Hellman had a spare room in his Laurel Canyon home, and McKay moved in. He performed in several films, and in 2008, he was cast to portray Layne Staley of Alice In Chains in Layne Staley: Get Born Again. This biographical film went into production but was never completed due to estate and legal issues.

McKay continued to act, but became more interested in all aspects of filmmaking. In 2008 he joined Melissa and Monte Hellman’s newly formed production company, wearing many hats as his late mentor Hellman's assistant on the 2010 Golden Lion award-winning film Road to Nowhere. He also performed and produced alongside the Hellman family.

McKay played a significant role in the re-release of Two-Lane Blacktop, assisting production on Somewhere Near Salinas with Kris Kristofferson and appearing in On the Road Again; Two-Lane Blacktop Revisited, through The Criterion Collection.

Evel Archaeology

2012-2018

Long enamored with his own father's and Evel Knievel's “live your dreams“ philosophy, McKay began his collection of Evel Knievel memorabilia in early 2012. After months of research and lengthy negotiation, he acquired his first set of Knievel's 1974 jump leathers and a performance helmet. Soon after, he traveled to Knievel's hometown of Butte, Montana for the annual Evel Knievel Days celebration. Forming connections with Knievel family, crew and fans. During a 2014 interview, McKay noted that none of Knievel's memorabilia was at the celebrations and that Knievel's ramps were left to rot in fields. This helped motivate him and his team.

With partnerships from the Knievel family, McKay, Robby Hull and Marilyn Stemp set out to resurrect Evel Knievel Enterprises. Thus began a worldwide hunt for Knievel memorabilia, which McKay termed "Evel Archaeology." By 2015, he owned the largest Evel Knievel collection ever assembled. He has exhibited the collection throughout the United States consistently since it was first displayed in 2013. It includes six jump bikes; X-rays of Evel's broken bones Knievel's performance leathers; and most iconic helmets, wardrobe, and personal effects.

After it was featured on the television series American Trucker, McKay purchased the truck Big Red with the assistance of Robb Mariani. The Mack truck Knievel used as living quarters and bike and ramp hauler and was badly weather-damaged. McKay, Mike Patterson, and his team of restoration experts at Historic Harley-Davidson in Topeka, Kansas, refurbished Big Red. A bolt-by-bolt restoration which took 22 months, 96 people and over $300,000.00 The truck's interior and exterior were restored to its exact condition in the 70s when Knievel, at the height of his popularity, travelled in it.

It was debuted and led the yearly parade at Evel Knievel Days in Butte in 2015. Driven by Mike Draper, who began driving for Knievel in the early 1970s, Big Red was displayed on tour at events throughout the United States with the support of Mack Trucks. The tour schedule included Evel Knievel days, Sturgis, Hollywood, Texas Motor Speedway and the Great American Trucking Show. It was the star attraction at the premiere of the documentary Being Evel. Big Red is to be permanently housed at the Evel Knievel Museum, which opened in Topeka, Kansas in July 2017. McKay refers to it as the "mothership" of his collection.

McKay was also a co-producer and rare film & photo archivist for the Emmy nominated documentary Being Evel with producers Johnny Knoxville and George Hamilton. He appeared in Derik Murray's documentary I Am Evel Knievel, with Matthew McConaughey, for which he was also a co-producer/archivist, and executive produced the Leo Award-winning feature-length documentary Chasing Evel: The Life of Robbie Knievel, which premiered at the Big Sky Documentary Film Festival and Nashville Film Festival in 2017. It was released worldwide in 2018.

2019-2021

In 2019 editing began on Resurrecting Evel/Evelution. Both films documenting the undertaking that was the restoration of Evel Knievel's Mack truck and the six-year journey that lead to the opening of the Museum. McKay co-produced and was featured in both the Austin, Texas-based film Off The Record and Reelz channel's Collision Course. In April 2019 production began on Evel Live 2 for A&E Networks and the Evel Knievel Museum received a THEA Award awarded by Themed Entertainment Association for being one of the best new attractions in the United States. Production for NBCUniversal's limited series Evel starring Milo Ventimiglia began in early January, 2020. The limited series was shut down just three days prior to principal photography due to the COVID-19 pandemic.

Personal life 

The years 2015 to 2017 were fortuitous as the inaugural tour of Big Red (partnering with Mack Trucks) went nationwide. It led the parade at Evel Knievel days in Butte, Montana. McKay and Doug Danger successfully completed their mutual dream of the world record 22-car jump on Evel's Harley Davidson XR750. During the 75th anniversary of the Sturgis motorcycle rally at the Legendary Buffalo Chip Campground. In 2015 he again partnered with the Knievel family on Evel Ale, a custom beer made by South Austin Brewery.

The Evel Knievel Museum opened in June 2017.

In July 2021 The Divine Horsemen released a reunion recording of new material that included a song titled Falling Forward. Mckay co wrote the song with founding member Julie Christensen.

In October 2021 production began on a feature length narrative docudrama on Mckay’s life with Derik Murray’s Network Entertainment.
Principal photography began in Kansas, California, Idaho, Montana and continues throughout 2022-2023.

Filmography

References

External links 
 Evel Knievel Museum
 

1978 births
Living people
American skateboarders
People from Austin, Texas
American male film actors
American collectors
21st-century American male actors